Primo Zeglio (8 July 1906 – 30 October 1984) was an Italian film director and writer.

Selected filmography

 The Mask of Cesare Borgia (1941)
Accadde a Damasco (1943)
Febbre (1943)
Genoveffa di Brabante (1947)
Nerone e Messalina (1949)
Revenge of the Pirates (1951)
La figlia del diavolo (1952)
Captain Phantom (1953)
Dimentica il mio passato (1956)
 The Son of the Red Corsair (1959)
Morgan, the Pirate (1960)
The Seven Revenges (1961)
Seven Seas to Calais (1962)
Slave Queen of Babylon (1962)
I am Semiramis (1963)
Texas Ranger (1964)
The Relentless Four (1965)
Killer Adios (1967)
Mission Stardust (1967)

References

External links

Biography

1906 births
1984 deaths
Italian film directors